Ishteryaki is a rural locality (a selo) in Uinsky District, Perm Krai, Russia. The population was 517 as of 2010. There are 10 streets.

Geography 
Ishteryaki is located 32 km southeast of Uinskoye (the district's administrative centre) by road. Kharino Ozero is the nearest rural locality.

References 

Rural localities in Perm Krai